Saint Albans, commonly abbreviated as St. Albans, is a town in Franklin County, Vermont, United States. As of the 2020 census, the population was 6,988. The town completely surrounds the city of St. Albans.

History
The town was named for St Albans in England, which itself is named after the Early Christian British saint and protomartyr.

On October 19, 1864, St. Albans was the site of the St. Albans Raid, the northernmost Confederate land action of the American Civil War, which was an enemy cavalry raid and bank robbery from across the border with Quebec, Canada.

The town of St. Albans and the city of St. Albans were separated in 1902. References to "St. Albans" prior to this date generally refer to the town center, which now belongs to the city. The town was incorporated in 1859, and the city in 1902.

Henri Le Caron, who, while acting as a secret agent of the British government, held the position of "Inspector-General of the Irish Republican Army", asserted that he distributed fifteen thousand stands of arms and almost three million rounds of ammunition in the care of the many trusted men stationed between New York and St. Albans, in preparation for the unsuccessful Fenian raid on Canada which took place in April 1870. United States General George Meade, forewarned, captured much of these munitions as they arrived.

In the 1890s, the town had become the butter capital of the world, with 1,000 farms and 15,000 cows.

Amelia Earhart was said to have flown here May 22, 1934.

Geography
The town is located in western Franklin County and extends west into Lake Champlain to the border with Grand Isle County. The southwest part of the town fronts on St. Albans Bay, an arm of Lake Champlain. Woods Island, Burton Island, and Ball Island within the lake are all part of the town.

Demographics

At the 2020 census, the racial makeup was 96.6% White, 0.2% Black, 0.1%  Native American, 2.0% Asian and 0.1 Latino of any race.

At the 2000 census, there were 5,086 people, 1,836 households and 1,404 families residing in the town. The population density was 135.4 per square mile (52.3/km2). There were 2,257 housing units at an average density of 60.1 per square mile (23.2/km2). The racial makeup of the town was 96.95% White, 0.39% Black or African American, 0.75% Native American, 0.33% Asian, 0.16% from other races, and 1.42% from two or more races. Hispanic or Latino of any race were 0.67% of the population.

There were 1,836 households, of which 38.2% had children under the age of 18 living with them, 61.6% were married couples living together, 11.1% had a female householder with no husband present, and 23.5% were non-families. 18.0% of all households were made up of individuals, and 7.5% had someone living alone who was 65 years of age or older. The average household size was 2.68 and the average family size was 3.01.

Age distribution was 27.0% under the age of 18, 5.7% from 18 to 24, 29.9% from 25 to 44, 23.3% from 45 to 64, and 14.1% who were 65 years of age or older. The median age was 38 years. For every 100 females, there were 95.8 males. For every 100 females age 18 and over, there were 90.7 males.

The median household income was $46,875, and the median family income was $53,147. Males had a median income of $34,698 versus $26,000 for females. The per capita income for the town was $18,604. About 7.4% of families and 5.8% of the population were below the poverty line, including 8.1% of those under age 18 and 4.7% of those age 65 or over.

Arts and culture

Annual cultural events
St. Albans town is located on the shore of Lake Champlain.  Every Fourth of July is marked by the "Bay Day" event, which includes a triathlon and a fireworks show on the bay.

Major routes
The town is served by the following numbered highways.

 Interstate 89, with access from Exits 19 and 20
 U.S. Route 7
 Vermont Route 36
 Vermont Route 38
 Vermont Route 104
 Vermont Route 105
 Vermont Route 207

Notable people

 Bradley Barlow, US congressman, industrialist
 William Beaumont, surgeon in the U.S. Army 
 Corydon Beckwith, Illinois Supreme Court justice
 Paul Blackburn, poet 
 Lawrence Brainerd, US senator
 Richard M. Brewer, assumed leader of Billy the Kid's band 
 Michael J. Colburn, director of the United States Marine Band
 Abbott Lowell Cummings, architectural historian and genealogist
 Sile Doty, infamous thief, counterfeiter, and criminal gang leader
 Albert S. Drew, mayor of Burlington, Vermont
 John LeClair, professional ice hockey player, left wing for the Montreal Canadiens, Philadelphia Flyers, and Pittsburgh Penguins
 Rod Loomis, actor
 William L. Manly, pioneer author, wrote "Death Valley in '49" 
 Sara Weeks Roberts, president, National Library for the Blind (United States)
 John Gregory Smith, 28th governor of Vermont
 William Farrar Smith, Union general during the American Civil War
 Orlando Stevens, member of the state legislatures of Vermont and Minnesota
 Benjamin Swift, US senator

Champ
The lake monster "Champ" was allegedly sighted and photographed near St. Albans. The creature in Lake Champlain was ostensibly given in 1609 by French explorer Samuel de Champlain, the founder of Quebec City and the lake's namesake, who is supposed to have been the first white man to record spotting "Champ" as he was fighting the Iroquois on the bank of the lake. However, in actuality no such sighting was recorded, and it has since been traced back to a 1970 article.

References

External links
 

 Town of St. Albans official website

 
Saint Albans, Vermont
 Saint Albans Town
Burlington, Vermont metropolitan area
Saint Albans, Vermont